Pavel Francouz (born 3 June 1990) is a Czech professional ice hockey goaltender for the Colorado Avalanche of the National Hockey League (NHL). Francouz won the Stanley Cup with the Avalanche in 2022.

Playing career

Czech Republic
Francouz first played at the junior level within the ranks of hometown club, HC Plzeň. As a 15-year-old he backstopped the club's under-18 team in the 2005–06 season posting sub 2.00 GAA. In the following 2006–07 season he led the league with 25 wins. In the 2007–08 season, Francouz assumed the starting goaltender position at the highest junior level in the Czech Republic at the under-20 league. He recorded 25 wins in 37 games to lead the club into the postseason.

Having signed a first team contract with HC Plzeň, Francouz made his professional debut in the Czech Extraliga during the 2008–09 season. In 15 games he collected 6 wins with a solid SV% of .922. At the under-20 level he finished the season with the League's best statistics in all categories.

Francouz spent the next 2009–10 season continuing his development, appearing in 8 Extraliga games, while also playing in the Czech 1. Liga on loan to HC Tabor and SK Horácká Slavia Třebíč.

On 13 May 2010, in order to earn more experience professionally, Francouz left Plzeň to sign a contract with HC Slovan Ústečtí Lvi of the Czech 1. Liga. In the 2010–11 season, he was initially loaned to former 1. Liga club SK Horácká slavia Třebíč before splitting the year in making an impact with his new club Ústečtí Lvi, posting the best GAA and SV% in the League and leading Slovan Ústečtí Lvi to the championship.

During his second season with Ústečtí in 2011–12, Francouz strong play was rewarded as he was loaned and trained with HC Oceláři Třinec. He made just one appearance with Třinec, allowing 4 goals against before he was replaced in the second intermission.

On 9 May 2012, Francouz secured a place in the Extraliga agreeing to a contract with HC Litvínov beginning from the 2012–13 season. He instantly assumed Litvínov's starting role and in 46 games repaid the club by registering the most league wins with 26 and earned recognition as the Extraliga's Best Goaltender.

In the 2014–15 season, Francouz through 46 games cemented his status as the best Goaltender in the Czech Republic, leading the league in most statistical categories, to earn the MVP award of both regular season and playoffs as Litvínov claimed the Championship.

Traktor Chelyabinsk
After three years in Litvínov, Francouz opted to leave as a free agent and continue his career in the Kontinental Hockey League (KHL) by agreeing to a three-year contract with Russian outfit Traktor Chelyabinsk on 30 April 2015. In his first season with Traktor in 2015–16, Francouz assumed backup duties to Vasili Demchenko. He posted a .924 save percentage despite collecting just 3 wins in 18 games as Chelyabinsk missed the postseason.

The following 2016–17 season, Francouz shared the starting role with Demchenko after initially earning KHL player of the week honors (30 October). He continued his strong play earning a selection to the 2017 All-Star Game. In 30 games with Traktor, Francouz accumulated 14 wins and finished the year with the KHL's best SVS% (.953).

Despite lucrative contract offers and interest, Francouz was not released from the final year of his contract and remained in Traktor for the 2017–18 season. He again shared starting duties and appeared in a season high 35 games with 15 wins, and for the second consecutive season led the league in SVS%. Selected to backstop the club in the postseason, and led Traktor to the Conference Finals before suffering a series defeat to eventual Champions Ak Bars Kazan.

Colorado Avalanche
Francouz signed a one-year, one-way deal of $690,000 with the Colorado Avalanche on 2 May 2018. After attending his first training camp with the Avalanche, Francouz was assigned to begin his first North American season in 2018–19 with American Hockey League (AHL) affiliate the Colorado Eagles. In transitioning to the smaller rink size, Francouz quickly adapted and registered 6 wins through his first 7 games with the Eagles, earning the starting role. He received his first call-up to the Avalanche on 22 December 2018, and immediately made his NHL debut, relieving Philipp Grubauer in a defeat against the Arizona Coyotes. Returning to the Eagles, Francouz was recalled for a second time and made a second consecutive appearance in relief stepping in against the San Jose Sharks on 1 January 2019. He returned to the AHL and was named in the 2019 AHL All-Star Classic before missing it due to injury. He led the Eagles to the postseason with a 27–17–3 record, finishing third in league wins and leading the AHL in saves. In the playoffs, Francouz started all four contests with the Eagles (posting 1 win), yet unable to help advance past the first-round. Joining the Avalanche's extended squad for their postseason run, Francouz was later re-signed to a one-year, $950,000 contract extension on 25 May 2019.

With the departure of longtime Avalanche goaltender Semyon Varlamov in the off-season, Francouz assumed the backup duties for Colorado leading into the 2019–20 season. He became the first Avalanche goaltender since Vitali Kolesnik in 2005, to collect his first win in his first NHL start, backstopping a 3–2 overtime victory over the Arizona Coyotes on 12 October 2019. Assuming a higher workload through injuries to Grubauer, Francouz established himself through November and December, posting a 9–0–1 record over 12 games, the longest undefeated streak since Varlamov in 2014. In the midst of starting a career high 7 straight games, on 21 February 2020, Francouz recorded his first NHL shutout and that same day the Avalanche signed him to a two-year, $4 million extension. He finished the regular season, leading the Avalanche with 21 wins and finishing in league top ten in both save percentage and goals against.

With the NHL returning for the playoffs after the COVID-19 pandemic enforced hiatus, Francouz made his postseason debut in the Western Conference seeding round, becoming the first goaltender in Franchise history to record a shutout in his first start after a 4–0 victory over the Dallas Stars on 5 August 2020. Helping Colorado advance to the second-round, Francouz was drawn into action after a season-ending injury to Philipp Grubauer in the opening series game on 22 August 2020. Hampered by injury himself, Francouz collected 3 defeats through four games against the Stars before he was ruled out through games 5-7 of the series loss.

In the pandemic-delayed 2020–21 season, Francouz having returned from double-knee surgery backed up Grubauer for the opening two games of the campaign before the Avalanche announced that Francouz would be placed on the long-term injured reserve list to have a season-ending double hip surgery on 4 February 2021.

Returning to health, Francouz suffered another setback after injuring his ankle in his first pre-season game for the 2021–22 season on 5 October 2021. Ruled out for the opening two months of the season, Francouz was sent on a conditioning loan in a return to the Colorado Eagles of the AHL. Collecting 3 wins through 4 games, Francouz returned to the Avalanche and made his first NHL appearance in over a year in a 5–2 defeat to the Nashville Predators on 16 December 2021. Returning to action after testing positive to COVID and a team-wide shut down, Francouz quickly regained his level of play and after recording 10 wins through his first 14 games, Francouz opted to forgo free agency to sign another two-year, $4 million extension with the Avalanche on 12 March 2022.

Francouz was summoned into action during the 2022 Stanley Cup playoffs after an eye injury to starter Darcy Kuemper during their first round matchup against the Nashville Predators, and would help the Avalanche win the last two games of the series in a sweep. He would later be named the starter for Game 2 of the Western Conference Finals against the Edmonton Oilers after Kuemper experienced complications to his eye injury. He recorded his second career postseason shutout in the game, stopping all 24 shots he faced. Francouz remained in net for the remainder of the conference finals, helping the Avalanche reach the 2022 Stanley Cup Finals.

International play

Francouz was first introduced to the International stage at the Junior level, competing for Czech Republic at the Division I 2008 World U18 Championships in Kazan, Russia. As the team's backup he appeared in one game, helping Czech Republic place first in Group A and return to the Top Division for the following year. He next featured for the Czechs at the 2010 World Junior Championship.

Francouz made his senior debut with the Czech Republic, competing in the 2013 World Championship. He made two relief appearances for the Czechs in a seventh-place finish. He was named to the roster of the 2014 World Championships, however failed to feature in a game before making his first full start at the 2016 World Championships.

In the 2017 World Championships he shared netminding duties with Petr Mrázek, posting a 3–1 record with a 1.49 goals against and .910 save percentage. As an established member of the national team, Francouz was next selected to participate at the 2018 Winter Olympics in PyeongChang, Korea. As the first choice, Francouz appeared in every game for the Czech Republic, posting a 4–2 record in helping reach the semi-finals before losing to Russia. He was unable to prevent the Czechs suffer a 6–4 defeat in the bronze medal game against Canada on 24 February 2018.

On 26 April 2018, Francouz was slated to make his fifth tournament appearance with Czech Republic after he was selected for the 2018 World Championships.

Personal life
Francouz was born in Plzeň of then Czechoslovakia. When he first started playing hockey, Francouz was a defenseman. His first language is Czech, but he also gained English and Russian fluency in high school. He holds a pilot license, in which he uses throughout the off-season.

Francouz and his wife welcomed their first child in April 2019.

Career statistics

Regular season and playoffs

International

Awards and honours

References

External links
 

1990 births
Living people
Colorado Avalanche players
Colorado Eagles players
Czech ice hockey goaltenders
HC Litvínov players
HC Oceláři Třinec players
Olympic ice hockey players of the Czech Republic
Ice hockey players at the 2018 Winter Olympics
HC Plzeň players
SK Horácká Slavia Třebíč players
HC Slovan Ústečtí Lvi players
Sportspeople from Plzeň
Stanley Cup champions
HC Tábor players
Traktor Chelyabinsk players
Undrafted National Hockey League players
Czech expatriate ice hockey players in the United States
Czech expatriate ice hockey players in Russia